Ampelakia may refer to:
Ampelakia, on Salamis
Ampelakia, Drama
Ampelakia, Larissa